Raj Bhavan (translation: Government House) is the official residence of the governor of Jharkhand. It is located in the capital city of Ranchi, Jharkhand. The present governor of Jharkhand is Ramesh Bais

Building

It was designed by Ar.Sadlow Ballerd.

In the premises of Raj Bhavan there is Audrey House, which is now the Governor's Secretariat, was built much earlier by Captain Hannyington, who was the Deputy Commissioner of Chota Nagpur from 1850 to 1856.

Gardens

In Raj Bhavan they are many lawns and gardens, which have been named after noted figures.
Akbar garden has been newly developed in 2005 and has a beautiful collection of roses and seasonal flowers. 
Buddha garden, named after the Buddha, has a beautiful landscape and a green house.
Mahatma Gandhi garden is in the south side of Raj Bhavan and it is a collection of medical plants. It has in its midst a beautiful fountain.
Nakshatra Vana is the new garden which has been developed.

See also
 Government Houses of the British Indian Empire

References

External links
 Official web site of Raj Bhavan

Governors' houses in India
Buildings and structures in Ranchi
Government of Jharkhand
Houses completed in 1931
1931 establishments in India
20th-century architecture in India